In South Korea, there are a number of national television networks, the three largest of which are KBS, MBC, and SBS. Most of the major television studios are located on Yeouido and Sangam-dong, Seoul. South Korea became the fourth adopter in Asia when television broadcasting began on 12 May 1956 with the opening of HLKZ-TV, a commercially operated television station. HLKZ-TV was established by the RCA Distribution Company (KORCAD) in Seoul with 186–192 MHz, 100-watt output, and 525 scanning lines.

Important genres of television shows include serial dramas, historical dramas, variety shows, game shows, news programs, and documentaries. All three networks have produced increasingly lavish historical dramas in recent years. Some South Korean television programs are available on satellite and multicultural channels in foreign countries. Korean television dramas have been widely popular in other East Asian, South Asian and Southeast Asian countries, and became popularized internationally at a later stage, with whole sets of videotapes or DVDs of series available with completed subtitles in different languages, online subtitle websites are also created by numerous fan clubs to cater to a global audience. Shopping channels have become quite popular in recent years as well, and the models sometimes put on entertaining acts during product pitches.

Most cable operators in South Korea were consolidated into 3 major telecommunication companies, KT, SK Telecom, and LG Uplus. They also operates Internet Protocol television services. There are approximately 14 million cable TV subscribers nationwide. The cable operator provides TPS to its subscribers. (with the exception of Arirang which is free).

History 
Since the beginning of the 1950s, television was introduced to Korea by RCA to sell second-hand black & white TV sets as a marketing scheme. Some TV sets were strategically set up at Pagoda Park, others at the Seoul Station and Gwanghwamun during this time. However it was not until 1956 when South Korea began its own television broadcasting station, the HLKZ-TV, part of the KORCAD (RCA Distribution Company). The first ever Korean television drama, 천국의 문 (The Gates of Heaven) debuted the same year, planning director Choi Chang-Bong spent two and a half months continuously fixing the script, preparing sets and even the first instance of special effects, all for a drama that lasted no longer than fifteen minutes.

The early 1960s saw a phenomenal growth in television broadcasting. On 1 October 1961 the first full-scale television station, HLKA-TV (now known as KBS 1TV), was established and began operation under the Ministry of Culture and Public Information.

Following KBS was Tongyang Broadcasting Corporation's TBC-TV which was launched in 1964, and ran until merged in 1980. It was the first private television network in South Korea.

The second commercial television system, MBC-TV, made its debut in 1969. The advent of MBC-TV brought significant development to the television industry in Korea and after 1969 the television industry was characterized by furious competition among the three networks.

The 1970s were highlighted by government intervention into the media system in Korea. In 1972, President Park Chung-hee government imposed censorship upon media through the Martial Law Decree. The government revised the Broadcasting Law under the pretext of improving the quality of television programming. After the revision of the law, the government expanded its control of media content by requiring all television and radio stations to review programming before and after transmission. Although the government argued that its action was taken as a result of growing public criticism of broadcasting media practices, many accused the government of wanting to establish a monopoly over television broadcasting.

The 1980s were the golden years for South Korea's television industry. Growth was phenomenal in every dimension: the number of programming hours per week rose from 56 in 1979 to nearly 88.5 in 1989; the number of television stations increased from 12 in 1979 to 78 by 1989; and the number of television sets grew from four million in 1979 to nearly six million in the same period. Despite producing color televisions for export, color television was not officially introduced in the country until late 1980. Color broadcasting, however, occasioned a renewal of strong competition among the networks. However, the South Korean TV industry was also suffered huge blows in this decade. During Chun Doo-hwan's regime, several newspapers, broadcasters and publications were forcibly closed, or were merged into a single organization. One of which is TBC-TV which was awarded to KBS. TBC-TV was then replaced by KBS 2TV. After the country's 1987 democratic reforms, several regulations were imposed to insulate broadcasters from political influence. For example, the National Assembly established the Foundation for Broadcast Culture to insulate MBC from political influence and KBS.

At the beginning of the 1990s, with the introduction of cable television, the government initiated an experimental multi-channel and multi-purpose cable television service. In addition, South Korea launched its first broadcasting/communication satellite, Mugungwha 1, to 36,000 km above the equator in 1995. The development of an integrated broadband network is expected to take the form of B-ISDN immediately after the turn of the century. This decade is a period of great technological change in the South Korean broadcasting industry, which will make broadcasting media even more important than in the past. In this decade the South Korean broadcasting industry will maximize the service with new technological developments such as DBS, satellites, and interactive cable systems, all of which will allow South Korea to participate fully in the information society.

On 22 July 2009, after heated political debates, amendment of the Media law passed the South Korean national assembly to deregulate the media market of South Korea. On 31 December 2010, four general Cable Television networks were licensed.

All analog broadcastings officially full-time completely turn off on New Year's Eve (31 December) 2012 at 03:59:59 KST (UTC+9) for all nationwide (including Seoul Capital Area such as Seoul, Gyeonggi Province and Incheon) so all analog broadcastings officially full-time completely turn off on same time. On New Year's Eve (31 December) 2012 at 04:00:00 KST (UTC+9), the digital terrestrial television of the South Korea fully turned, shifted and switched to all full ultra high definition for all nationwide (including Seoul Capital Area such as Seoul, Gyeonggi Province and Incheon).

National networks 
In South Korea, there are four nationwide free-to-air terrestrial television networks, three general networks and one educational network as follows:

List of television channels 
All of them are free-to-air channels. Furthermore, all of them are the official digital terrestrial television and ATSC providers of the nation (since 2005, approved by the Korean Government).

Public broadcasting channels

Commercial broadcasting channels
In South Korea, many commercial television networks have been created after the deregulation taken in 1961 till 1990.
SBS is responsible in distributing its programming content nationally, but is not responsible for producing local content aired by their affiliates.

Cable TV networks/channels

Most viewed channels

See also

 Outline of South Korea
 List of South Korean television series
 Television in North Korea

References